Hampshire county cricket teams have been traced back to the 18th century but the county's involvement in cricket goes back much further than that. Given that the first definite mention of cricket anywhere in the world is dated c.1550 in Guildford, in neighbouring Surrey, it is almost certain that the game had reached Hampshire by the 16th century.

17th century
As elsewhere in south east England, cricket became established in Hampshire during the 17th century and the earliest village matches took place before the English Civil War. It is believed that the earliest county teams were formed in the aftermath of the Restoration in 1660.

A Latin poem by Robert Matthew in 1647 contains a probable reference to cricket being played by pupils of Winchester College on nearby St Catherine's Hill. If authentic, this is the earliest known mention of cricket in Hampshire. But with the sport having originated in Saxon or Norman times on the Weald, it must have reached Hampshire long before 1647.

In 1680, lines written in an old Bible invite "All you that do delight in Cricket, come to Marden, pitch your wickets". Marden is in West Sussex, north of Chichester, and close to Hambledon, which is just across the county boundary in Hampshire.

18th century
Hampshire was used in a team name for the first time in August 1729, when a combined Hampshire, Surrey and Sussex XI played against Kent.

The earliest known cricket match to have been played in Hampshire took place on Tues 22 May 1733. It was at Stubbington, near Portsmouth, between Married v Single. The Married team won. Details were found by Martin Wilson in the American Weekly Mercury, a Philadelphia newspaper dated 20 to 27 September 1733. Wilson subsequently found an earlier version of the report in an English newspaper, the 18 June 1733 edition of Parker's Penny Post.

Hambledon Club
The origin of the Hambledon Club is lost and there is no definite knowledge of Hambledon cricket before 1756 when its team had gained sufficient repute to be capable of attempting three matches against Dartford, which had been a famous club since the 1720s if not earlier. It is not known when the Hambledon Club was founded and it seems likely that some kind of parish organisation was operating in 1756, although there may well have been a patron involved.

The Sussex v Hampshire match in June 1766 is the earliest reference to Hampshire as an individual county team. Some historians believe it was at about this time that the club, as distinct from a parish organisation, was founded. Hampshire teams in the 18th century have first-class status.

The Hambledon Club was in many respects a Hampshire county club for it organised Hampshire matches, although it was a multi-functional club and not dedicated to cricket alone. Its membership attracted large numbers of sporting gentry and it dominated the sport, both on and off the field, for about thirty years until the formation of Marylebone Cricket Club (MCC) in 1787. Hambledon produced Hampshire players including batsman John Small and the two fast bowlers Thomas Brett and David Harris.

19th century
Following the demise of the Hambledon Club towards the end of the 18th century, Hampshire continued to be recognised as a first-class county team into the 19th century. After the 1828 season, Hampshire had long spells without any first-class matches until the county club was founded in 1864. The county played some first-class fixtures during 1842 to 1845 and one match versus MCC in 1861 but was otherwise outside cricket's mainstream through 1829 to 1863. Hampshire County Cricket Club was founded on 12 August 1863 and played its initial first-class match against Sussex at the Antelope Ground, Southampton on 7 and 8 July 1864.

Venues
Hampshire played their home matches prior to the formation of Hampshire County Cricket Club at the following grounds:

References

Bibliography
 Derek Birley, A Social History of English Cricket, Aurum, 1999
 Rowland Bowen, Cricket: A History of its Growth and Development, Eyre & Spottiswoode, 1970
 G. B. Buckley, Fresh Light on 18th Century Cricket, Cotterell, 1935
 Arthur Haygarth, Scores & Biographies, Volume 1 (1744-1826), Lillywhite, 1862
 Timothy J. McCann, Sussex Cricket in the Eighteenth Century, Sussex Record Society, 2004 
 H. T. Waghorn, Cricket Scores, Notes, etc. (1730-1773), Blackwood, 1899
 H. T. Waghorn, The Dawn of Cricket, Electric Press, 1906

History of Hampshire
English cricket teams in the 18th century
English cricket in the 19th century
Former senior cricket clubs
Cricket in Hampshire